In the theory of partial differential equations, Holmgren's uniqueness theorem, or simply Holmgren's theorem, named after the Swedish mathematician Erik Albert Holmgren (1873–1943), is a uniqueness result for linear partial differential equations with real analytic coefficients.

Simple form of Holmgren's theorem

We will use the multi-index notation:
Let ,
with  standing for the nonnegative integers;
denote  and

 .

Holmgren's theorem in its simpler form could be stated as follows:

Assume that P = ∑|α| ≤m Aα(x)∂  is an elliptic partial differential operator with real-analytic coefficients. If Pu is real-analytic in a connected open neighborhood Ω ⊂ Rn, then u is also real-analytic.

This statement, with "analytic" replaced by "smooth", is Hermann Weyl's classical lemma on elliptic regularity:

If P is an elliptic differential operator and Pu is smooth in Ω, then u is also smooth in Ω.

This statement can be proved using Sobolev spaces.

Classical form

Let  be a differential operator with real-analytic coefficients.

.

Above,

 

.

The classical formulation of Holmgren's theorem is as follows:

Holmgren's theorem

Relation to the Cauchy–Kowalevski theorem

Consider the problem

with the Cauchy data

Assume that  is real-analytic with respect to all its arguments in the neighborhood of 

Theorem (Cauchy–Kowalevski)

Note that the Cauchy–Kowalevski theorem does not exclude the existence of solutions which are not real-analytic.

Holmgren's theorem states that the solution  is real-analytic and hence, by the Cauchy–Kowalevski theorem, is unique.

See also

 Cauchy–Kowalevski theorem
 FBI transform

References

Partial differential equations
Theorems in analysis
Uniqueness theorems